Fedin is a Russian masculine surname, its feminine counterpart is Fedina. It may refer to
Andrei Fedin (born 1970), Russian football player
Ilya Fedin (born 1989), Russian ice hockey winger 
Konstantin Fedin (1892–1977), Russian novelist
Maxim Fedin (born 1996), Kazakh football midfielder 
Sergei Fedin (born 1981), Russian football player
Vasily Fedin (1926–2005), Soviet cyclist
Fyodor Fedin (1919–1944), Soviet non-commissioned officer and Hero of the Soviet Union

Russian-language surnames